Afghanistan has competed at the IAAF World Athletics Championships on seven occasions, and did not send a delegation from 1987 to 2001, and for the 2005 and 2019 championships. Its competing country code is AFG. The country has not won any medals at the competition and as of 2017 no Afghan athlete has progressed beyond the first round of an event.

References 

 
Afghanistan
World Championships in Athletics